Caribou–Targhee National Forest is located in the states of Idaho and Wyoming, with a small section in Utah in the United States. To the east the forest borders Yellowstone National Park, Grand Teton National Park and Bridger–Teton National Forest. Most of the forest is a part of the  Greater Yellowstone Ecosystem.

Description
Caribou and Targhee National Forests were combined from original forest lands created in 1891. Two designated wilderness areas are located in the easternmost sections of the forest, bordering on National Park lands. The  Jedediah Smith Wilderness is adjacent to Grand Teton National Park on the western slope of the Teton Range. Known for karst limestone formations, the wilderness has many caves and provides excellent views of the less often seen west face of the Teton peaks. The smaller  Winegar Hole Wilderness borders Yellowstone National Park and the John D. Rockefeller, Jr. Memorial Parkway, and was set aside primarily to protect prime grizzly bear habitat.

While western sections of the forest have a mixture of sagebrush and grasses, the higher elevations in the east support lodgepole pine, and numerous species of spruce and fir. In addition to grizzlies most of the major megafauna associated with Yellowstone National Park can be found in Caribou–Targhee National Forest. Mammalian species of black bear, wolf, elk, moose, mule deer, bison, cougar, and pronghorn have all been seen by visitors on forest lands. An active peregrine falcon recovery program was begun to return this bird species to some of their ancestral range. Cutthroat trout, brook trout and pike are found in the streams and lakes and the forest is considered one of the best fishing areas in the world for cutthroat trout.

Dozens of campgrounds and 1,600 miles (2,500 km) of trails allow access to much of the forest. There are two trails that access the high altitude Alaska Basin immediately west of the main Teton Range peaks and allow access to trails in Grand Teton National Park.

There are local ranger district offices located in Malad City, Montpelier, Pocatello, and Soda Springs in Idaho.

There are local ranger district offices located in Ashton, Driggs, Dubois, and Island Park in Idaho. In Island Park is Big Springs, a first-magnitude spring that is the source of the South Fork of Henrys Fork.

Linkage of limited habitat, through ecological corridors, is the current, most favored, method of effectively restoring native wildlife communities. Many such corridors have been identified where wildlife conservation is a concern. The montane nature of the Caribou National Forest and its juxtaposition make it a very important, fragile and unique link between the northern and southern Rocky Mountains. If restoration of native species is to be achieved throughout the wildlands of the American West, the Caribou will play an important role.

The combined Caribou–Targhee National Forest is managed by the Forest Service from offices in Idaho Falls, Idaho.

Wilderness areas
There are two officially designated wilderness areas within the Caribou–Targhee National Forest that are part of the National Wilderness Preservation System. Both lie just south of Yellowstone National Park, in the Targhee National Forest section.
 Jedediah Smith Wilderness
 Winegar Hole Wilderness

Counties
Counties are listed in descending order of forestland area, by forest.

Caribou National Forest
 Caribou County, Idaho
 Bonneville County, Idaho
 Bannock County, Idaho
 Bear Lake County, Idaho
 Oneida County, Idaho
 Franklin County, Idaho
 Lincoln County, Wyoming
 Power County, Idaho
 Box Elder County, Utah
 Cache County, Utah

Targhee National Forest

 Fremont County, Idaho
 Clark County, Idaho
 Teton County, Wyoming
 Bonneville County, Idaho
 Teton County, Idaho
 Lemhi County, Idaho
 Lincoln County, Wyoming
 Butte County, Idaho
 Madison County, Idaho
 Jefferson County, Idaho

See also

References

External links

 "Caribou National Forest-Montpelier Ranger District-Montpelier Watershed Analysis"
 "Lumber, Stone & Concrete", Administrative Facilities of the Caribou–Targhee National Forests, 1891-1955
 
 Map of Caribou–Targhee National Forest
 Official Twitter feed of Caribou–Targhee National Forest